General elections were held in Tonga in May 1969.

Electoral system
The Legislative Assembly had seven directly-elected members; three representing Tongatapu and nearby islands, two representing Haʻapai and two representing Vavaʻu and nearby islands. A further seven members were elected by the nobility based on the same constituencies, seven ministers (including the governors of Haʻapai and Vavaʻu) and a Speaker chosen by the monarch.

Results
Three incumbent MPs (Pousima Afeaki and Lopeti Tofaimalaealoa of Haʻapai and Lopoi Tupou of Tongatapu) lost their seats.

Aftermath
The newly elected Legislative Assembly was opened by King Tāufaʻāhau Tupou IV on 19 June.

References

1969 in Tonga
Tonga
Elections in Tonga